The protection of borders between the Czechoslovak Socialist Republic (CSSR) and Capitalist countries of Western Europe, namely with West Germany and Austria, in the Cold War era and especially after 1951, was provided by special troops of the Pohraniční Stráž and system of engineer equipment which created the real "Iron Curtain". The purpose was to prevent citizens of the Eastern Bloc escaping to the West, although official reports stated it was to keep the enemy's spies and saboteurs out of Czechoslovakia. The border system of Czechoslovakia was not as elaborate and fortified as that of the Inner German border or the Berlin Wall, but it was considered difficult to cross the border undetected.

History and development 

After World War II the original borders of Czechoslovakia were restored and special units of police (SNB) were established to protect the borders together with the army. In this time the main goal of the border protection force was to ensure that the expelled German civil population of the border areas (3,6 Million people) could not return. Thus to stabilize the situation after the ethnic cleansing of the formerly German inhabited border areas. Therefore, some hundred empty villages in the border areas have been raised to the ground to create an uninhabited easy controllable border strip. Following the Communist takeover in the government, thousands of opponents of the communist regime tried to escape the country. For individuals or small groups it was quite easy to avoid the guards and cross the borders, though it was dangerous if they were spotted, as the guards were allowed to shoot the escapees on sight. About 10,000 people, including 50 prominent politicians, crossed the borders in the first year after the political change.

Subsequently, the independent HQ of Border Guard was created, but the number of staff was nearly the same (about 6,000 men) as the detection of potential emigrants by regular police was preferred. For example, the entire Aš-Bulge creating the most problematic part of the border territory fell within the border zone.

Substantial changes occurred by the end of 1951, after several successful attempts of mass escape. The Border Guard was reorganised into two brigades with headquarters in Cheb and Znojmo, and the number of members increased to 17,000. Finally, the real iron containment by means of engineer equipment was built. From 1951 onwards, this area was guarded by a signal fence some kilometres inside the border, while the border itself was secured by a guarded strip with a single barbed wire fence. This fence, originally an electric fence with a voltage of 5000 V, was replaced starting in 1968 by a double wire mesh fence similar to that used on the Inner German border. In addition,  the border was fitted with watch towers. In contrast with the concrete towers used in East Germany, these towers were usually made of wood or steel. In some areas several types of land mine were used, notably PP Mi-Ba, PP Mi-D, and PP Mi.

The barrier typically lay around  inside the actual boundary line. As the fence was not visible from there at some places, curious or careless West German strollers often overlooked border markers and mistakenly entered Czechoslovak territory, leading to their arrest.

Occurrences such as the drama at the West German embassy in Prague, where thousands of East Germans were hiding, wore down the patience of the Czechoslovak authorities, who eventually gave in, allowed all East Germans travel directly to West Germany from 3 November 1989, thus breaking the Iron Curtain.

On 17 November 1989, the Velvet Revolution took place. The barbed wire on the borders with East Germany and Austria was removed from 5 December onward, and from 11 December the Czechoslovak fortifications on the West German border were dismantled.

The Czech Republic, Slovakia, Germany, and Austria are now all part of the Schengen Agreement, which allows border crossing without identity checks.

See also
 Czechoslovak border fortifications during the Cold War
 Velvet Revolution: key events of the following weeks.
 Operation Border Stone

References

Borders of Czechoslovakia
Borders of West Germany
Austria–Czech Republic border
Austria–Slovakia border
Czechoslovakia–Germany relations
Buildings and structures demolished in 1989
Cold War fortifications